Vanity Fair is a 1932 American pre-Code drama film directed by Chester M. Franklin and starring Myrna Loy, Conway Tearle and Anthony Bushell. The film is modernized adaptation of William Makepeace Thackeray's 1848 novel of the same name with the original Regency-era story reset in Twentieth Century Britain. Three years later Thackeray's novel was adapted again as Becky Sharp, the first three-strip technicolor film.

Plot

This film adaptation's storyline begins around 1920 and concludes in 1933.  In its opening scene a limousine is traveling down a road outside London.  In the car are two passengers, Amelia Sedley (Barbara Kent) and her friend Becky Sharp (Myrna Loy), young ladies who agewise are in their twenties.  Amelia is from a rich, well-connected family, while Becky is from very modest means and has no family at all.  Given Becky's circumstances, Amelia has invited her to her home for the Christmas holidays.

At the Sedley estate Amelia's family welcomes their guest, but the mother is soon wary of her.  Those suspicions are warranted, for Becky aims to use her beauty and guile to gain wealth and privilege by climbing England's social ladder.  Her first target for achieving those goals is Joseph, Amelia's much-older brother (Billy Bevan). After Becky tries unsuccessfully to trap him into marriage, Mrs. Sedley sees her cuddling in the home's drawing room with her daughter's fiancé, George Osborne.  Disgusted, the mother calls "Miss Sharp" into the adjoining room, where she advises Becky to leave immediately so she can begin the job she had accepted before the holidays, that of governess for the family of Sir Pitt Crawley.  Becky heeds the thinly veiled advice and departs.

Upon her arrival at the residence of Lord Crawley, Becky quickly stirs the passions of both the elderly Sir Pitt and his son Rawdon (Conway Tearle).  The new governess entices them with her suggestive comments and by allowing each man into her bedroom at night while she glides about in her satin pajamas.  Soon she and Rawdon begin a secretive affair, but Sir Pitt finally catches them together in Becky's bedroom.  There they inform him they had married the previous day.  That news enrages the old man, who orders his son and his "shameless little hussy" out of his house.

Relocating to a townhouse in London's Mayfair district, Becky and Rawdon feel the financial strains of being cut off from Lord Crawley and his wealth.  The couple at first brings in money by betting and cheating their friends playing bridge.  That income, however, is insufficient for their mounting bills, so Becky schemes to find other ways to get money.  She does so through blackmail and by obtaining gifts from a string of lovers, including George Osborne, now the husband of her friend Amelia.  Eventually, even Rawdon cannot tolerate his wife's wanton, criminal behavior.  On the evening he is released from police custody for writing bad checks, Rawdon finds Becky at their home with another lover.  He declares their marriage is over and gives her only ten minutes to vacate the premises.  As she leaves, he informs Becky that his father had just died, and he is now the new Lord Crawley.  He then warns her that if she ever dares to refer to herself as "Lady Crawley," he will track her down and kill her.

Several years pass and Becky lives in a far less affluent, largely French-speaking area of London.  There she prowls the area's bars and casinos, getting money from the assorted men she meets.  One evening in a casino, she sees Amelia's brother Joseph, who updates her about his sister's situation.  While Becky already knows that Amelia's husband George had died five years earlier in a horse-riding accident, she learns from Joseph that Amelia still refuses to remarry.  Subsequently she also learns that her friend's devotion to George's memory and her mistaken belief in his fidelity have led Amelia to refuse repeated marriage proposals from Dobbin, a gentleman who has adored her for years.  Sometime later, Becky invites Amelia to her apartment and confesses her affair with George.  She then calls Amelia a fool for revering a dead "cad" and urges her to wed Dobbin, who is waiting outside in a car.  When Amelia rejoins him after Becky's disclosures, she rests her head on Dobbin's shoulder, implying that his next proposal will be accepted.

The film sequence that follows shows the passage of more years and the ongoing disintegration of Becky's life, which has become a daily struggle marked by petty crimes, prostitution, and meager funds.  In the final scene Becky enters her shabby one-room apartment.  Lying on the bed is Joseph, stirring from his latest binge.  She addresses him as "my love" and informs him that his sister had just given her another check.  He is infuriated and tells her never to accept money again from Amelia.  Becky turns, sits at a dresser, and stares into its mirror.  In the reflection she watches her face transform from the reality of its present haggard appearance to its former beauty.  She then notices that Joseph has quietly departed.  She also notices on a small bedside bureau that he has torn up his sister's check, and in the dust that coats the bureau's surface he has written Finis ("The End").  The film concludes with Becky lowering her face into her hands and weeping.

Cast
Myrna Loy as Becky Sharp
Conway Tearle as Rawdon Crawley
Barbara Kent as Amelia Sedley
Walter Byron as George Osborne
Anthony Bushell as Dobbin
Billy Bevan as Joseph Sedley
Montagu Love as Marquis of Steyne
Herbert Bunston as Mr. Sedley
Mary Forbes as Mrs. Sedley
Lionel Belmore as Sir Pitt Crawley
Wild Bill Elliott as Minor Role (uncredited)
Tom Ricketts as Parker (uncredited)

Reception
Vanity Fair received largely negative reviews in 1932 from some of the film industry's leading trade publications. The critic for Variety could not recommend the film, finding its acting "competent" but the overall production poorly scripted and its direction deficient:

The Film Daily was even more critical of the film than Variety. The subheading of its review summarized the film as being a "Dull Drama" and an "Uninteresting Adaptation of Classic Novel That Falls Flat". The influential publication found Conway Tearle's performance to be the only aspect of the production that was truly noteworthy:

{{Blockquote|''Vanity Fairs slow tempo, English accents, and draggy direction does not help it any. Myrna Loy has the role of Becky Sharpe, and is alluring as usual. But her part is so unsympathetic and the string of gents she trims appear such boobs that there is no cause for the audience to get enthusiastic or vitally interested ... Conway Tearle is her main victim, and after going along for half the distance, suddenly drops out of the picture, and you never see or hear from him again. He is the only one who puts a real vital spark in his role. When he goes, the picture goes with him. From then on it is a dismal portrayal of Becky's gradual fall into poverty and misery. The ending is distinctly depressing.}}

See also
Vanity Fair (1915)
Vanity Fair (1923)

External links

 

ReferencesNotes'''

1932 films
1932 drama films
American drama films
American black-and-white films
Films about social class
Films based on Vanity Fair (novel)
Films set in London
Films set in England
Films directed by Chester Franklin
Films with screenplays by F. Hugh Herbert
1930s English-language films
1930s American films